Mavis Wilson (born ) is a former politician in Ontario, Canada. She was a Liberal member of the Legislative Assembly of Ontario from 1987 to 1990 who represented the riding of Dufferin—Peel. She served as a cabinet minister in the government of David Peterson.

Background
Wilson and her husband Bruce manage a potato farm in the Orangeville, Ontario region. Together they raised three children Vanessa Wilson, Taylor Wilson and Hunter Wilson.

Politics
Wilson began her political career as a school trustee, served on the Dufferin County Board of Education for eleven years (including three as chair).

She was elected to the Ontario legislature in the 1987 provincial election, defeating her Progressive Conservative opponent by almost 6,000 votes in the riding of Dufferin—Peel.  David Peterson's Liberals won a landslide majority in this election, and Wilson was appointed as a Minister without Portfolio responsible for Senior Citizen's Affairs on September 10, 1987.  On August 2, 1989, she was appointed Minister responsible for Women's Issues, a post she held until her defeat in the September 1990 election.

The Liberals were defeated by the New Democratic Party in the 1990 provincial election.  Wilson lost her seat by 572 votes to David Tilson of the Progressive Conservative Party of Ontario.  She attempted to regain the seat in the 1995 provincial election, but lost by almost 15,000 votes amid a Progressive Conservative majority government victory.

Cabinet positions

References

External links
 

1949 births
Women government ministers of Canada
Living people
Ontario Liberal Party MPPs
Ontario school board trustees
People from Orangeville, Ontario
Women MPPs in Ontario